Michael George "Mike" Scandolera  (born 19 August 1959) is an Australian badminton player. 

Scandolera took part in the 1989 Badminton World Championships. He achieved a world ranking of 17 in the men's doubles and 65 in the men's singles. At the 1986 Commonwealth Games he won the bronze medal with the Australian team and the gold medal in the mixed doubles with Audrey Tuckey. Four years earlier he won another bronze medal with the Australian team at the Commonwealth Games. This was the first ever gold medal won in Australian Badminton History.

Results

References

External links

Australian male badminton players
Living people
1959 births
Commonwealth Games medallists in badminton
Commonwealth Games gold medallists for Australia
Commonwealth Games bronze medallists for Australia
Badminton players at the 1982 Commonwealth Games
Badminton players at the 1986 Commonwealth Games
Medallists at the 1986 Commonwealth Games